The Signalkuppe (in German, pronounced seeg-nall-koo-pay) also known as Punta Gnifetti (in Italian) (4,554 m) is a peak in the Pennine Alps on the border between Italy and Switzerland. It is a subpeak of Monte Rosa. The mountain is named after 'the Signal', a prominent gendarme atop the east ridge, named Cresta Signal.

The first ascent was made by Giovanni Gnifetti, a parish priest from Alagna Valsesia, together with J. Farinetti, C. Ferraris, C. Grober, J. and G. Giordiano and their porters on 9 August 1842.

The highest hut in Europe, the Margherita Hut (named after Italy's Queen consort Margherita of Savoy) lies on the summit of the mountain. Work started in 1890, supported by the Italian crown, and Queen Margherita opened it in 1893. The new hut, effectively a high-altitude Faraday cage, is clad in sheet copper to shield against unwanted electrical fields.

See also

List of Alpine four-thousanders
List of mountains of Switzerland named after people

References
 Dumler, Helmut and Willi P. Burkhardt, The High Mountains of the Alps, London: Diadem, 1994
 Collomb, Robin G., (ed.), Pennine Alps Central, London: Alpine Club, 1975

External links
 The Signalkuppe on SummitPost
 Photographic account of an ascent of the Signal ridge (in Italian)
 Margherita hut page (Capanna Margherita, in Italian)
 Margherita hut official page from Rifugimonterosa.it (in english)
 Other photos of Margherita hut ascent from Alagna (in Italian)

Mountains of the Alps
Alpine four-thousanders
Mountains of Piedmont
Mountains of Valais
Pennine Alps
Italy–Switzerland border
International mountains of Europe
Monte Rosa
Mountains of Switzerland
Four-thousanders of Switzerland